Anna Murià i Romaní (pseudonym, Romaní; 21 April 1904 – 27 September 2002) was a Spanish narrator, translator, literary critic, and journalist of Catalan descent who wrote short stories, novels, children's literature, and essays. A feminist activist, Murià i Romaní served as secretary of the Institució de les Lletres Catalanes, was a founding member of the Grup Sindical d'Escriptors Catalans (Union Group of Catalan Writers; 1936), and was an Honorary Member of the Associació d'Escriptors en Llengua Catalana.

Early life and education
Born in Barcelona, Murià i Romaní was the daughter of the journalist and filmmaker, Magí Murià i Torner. She attended religious schools before studying commerce, accounting and English at the l'Institut de Cultura i Biblioteca de la Dona (1918–24).

Career
Murià i Romaní was a relevant political female writer. She was involved with Acció Catalana, but joined Esquerra Republicana de Catalunya (Republican Left of Catalonia) in 1932, where she helped with the collection of signatures in favor of the adoption of the Statute of Autonomy of 1932 (es). In 1932, she organized the "Front Únic Femení Esquerrista" (United Front of Women from the Left) together with other relevant female activists and writers of the time such as Rosa Maria Arquimbau. In 1936, she joined the central committee of the Estat Català. Along with Ana María Martínez Sagi, Murià i Romaní was also a member of El Club Femení i d'Esports de Barcelona.

During the Spanish Civil War, she was an official of the Generalitat of Catalonia, where she acted as secretary of the Institució de les Lletres Catalanes (Institute of Catalan Letters), collaborated in publications such La Dona Catalana, La Rambla, La Nau, Meridià and Diari de Catalunya. She was also a member of the Women's Union of Catalonia and a co-founder of the Grup Sindical d'Escriptors Catalans (Union Group of Catalan Writers). While she wrote several novels, Aquest sera el principi ("This will be the Beginning"; 1986) is considered her major opus.

Personal life
Murià i Romaní met her husband, the poet Agustí Bartra, in 1939, and they went into exile together. They had two children, a son, the anthropologist, Roger Bartra, and a daughter, the philosopher, Eli Bartra. Before returning to Catalonia, Murià i Romaní and Bartra traveled through the Dominican Republic, Cuba and Mexico. Muria i Romani died in Terrassa in 2002; she was a close friend of the writer, Mercè Rodoreda.

Selected works

References

External links
 

1904 births
2002 deaths
20th-century Spanish novelists
20th-century Spanish women writers
20th-century translators
20th-century short story writers
20th-century essayists
Women writers from Catalonia
Translators from Catalonia
Literary critics from Catalonia
Journalists from Catalonia
Spanish feminists
Spanish women's rights activists
Spanish women short story writers
Short story writers from Catalonia
Novelists from Catalonia
Spanish women novelists
Spanish children's writers
Spanish women essayists
Spanish essayists
Spanish women children's writers
Spanish women literary critics
Women founders
Organization founders